The Women's 4 x 50 metre freestyle relay 20pts swimming event at the 2004 Summer Paralympics was competed on 24 September. It was won by the team representing .

Final round

24 Sept. 2004, evening session

Team Lists

References

W
2004 in women's swimming